Lauris is a given name. In Latvia, it is exclusively a masculine name. In other regions, it can be both a masculine and feminine given name. Individuals bearing the name Lauris include:

Masculine
Lauris Bajaruns (born 1989), Latvian ice hockey player
Lauris Bērziņš, Latvian luger 
Lauris Dārziņš (born 1985), Latvian ice hockey forward
Lauris Norstad (1907–1988), American United States Army Air Forces and United States Air Force General
Lauris Reiniks (born 1979), Latvian pop music singer, songwriter, television host, and actor
Lauris Strautmanis, Latvian sport shooter

Feminine
Lauris Edmond (1924–2000), New Zealand poet and writer
Lauris Elms (born 1931), Australian opera and lied contralto

See also
 Lauri (disambiguation)

References

Unisex given names
Latvian masculine given names